An assault course (also called trim trail) is a trail (or course) that combines running and exercising. It was more popular in the 1970s than it is now. It is often used in military training. The prime use is to evaluate progress and weaknesses of the individual or the team involved. The term Assault Course is sometimes replaced by Obstacle Course, which some view as more accurate. Confidence Courses is another term used. There are also specific Urban Obstacle Courses and Night Obstacles Courses. An Obstacle Course Race (OCR) is a civilian sporting and fitness challenge event which combines obstacles and cross country running.

Military training
Assault courses are used in military training to increase fitness, to demonstrate techniques that can be used for crossing obstacles, and to increase teamwork and self-confidence.

Military Assault Courses help develop:
Physical Fitness: Strength; Stamina; Mobility.
Technique: Such as how to climb over wall and lower oneself safely.
Teamwork: Especially on obstacles that can only be crossed as a team such a high walls.
Mental Ability: Overcoming challenges and fears by personal courage and determination.

Often military assault courses will be standardised, and will have, for example (in the UK), a six-foot and a ten-foot wall, a climbing net, some type of bar to climb over, and a high rope or net that must be crossed (these being or representing the most likely difficult terrain that a soldier will come across). The standardisation means that every course will be to the same quality, though it also means that there will be certain parts that may be familiar if practised.

However, they have different purposes. For example, they can be short (less than a minute) with a rifle range on the end (e.g. Junior Leaders, Folkestone), or long (five minutes) as at Thetford. This is partially because of space restraints and training objectives. The short one can be run as an individual course and a warmup for the range. The long Thetford course is more of an exercise in endurance and teamwork.

Individual Obstacles can be for general fitness, of for quite specific task such as cargo nets which simulates soldiers climbing down nets from ships into Landing Craft for Beachhead Landings. Climbing through windows is a useful skill when operating in built-up areas, and climbing ladders and over walls proved useful on recent operations.

Worldwide common assault course obstacles include barbed wire or nets to crawl under, pipes or tunnels to crawl through, walls to climb over, beams, walls or planks to balance on, steps to climb up, walls with window size holes to climb through, and mazes to negotiate. Overhead traverse (monkey bars) are popular. 

The Conseil International du Sport Militaire’s (CISM) Military Pentathlon Obstacle Course: There are 5 parts of the CISM Military Pentathlon: Shooting; Obstacle Swimming; Grenade Throwing; Cross Country Running and an Obstacle Course. The Obstacle Course is the signature event of the Military Pentathlon, and is 500 metres long with 20 standard obstacles: Rope ladder; Double beam; Trip wires; Crawl; Stepping-stones; Vault; Balance beam; Sloping wall with rope; Horizontal beams; Irish table; Tunnel and twin beams; Four steps; Ramp and ditch; Low wall; 2m deep Pit; Vertical ladder; High wall; Zigzag balance beam; Chicane; Three low walls close together. The women’s competition omits the rope ladder, sloping wall with rope, four steps and vertical ladder. International Naval Obstacle Course Competitions are similar and have additional naval type task such as closing and securing hatches. These competitions are run in sports clothing, and can be individual or team events with each team member covering a section of the course. The Military Pentathalon Obstacle Course are completed in around 2 minutes. The CISM Obstacle Course design is used by many armed forces around the world.

Russian Federation Army Assault Courses usually have: a chicane; walls with holes to crawl through; widely spaced steps representing a broken staircase; balance beams representing a broken bridge; tunnels and often include throwing a dummy Hand Grenade from the final trench. Russian Assault Courses' often have monkey bars in an inverted V shape, higher in the middle.

The Republic of Singapore Army's Standard Obstacle Course (SOC) dates from 1967, in 2010, the SOC was redesigned to provide realistic obstacles which may be found in either the jungle or urban battlefield. 6 old obstacles were removed (including the Monkey Bars which were known on the SOC as the Swing Trainer) and 7 new obstacles added. The new SOC has 12 obstacles: Low wall, stepping stones, rubble, tunnels, dodging panels, low rope climb, ditch, corridor, balance bridge, window, apex ladder, and terrace.

The Swiss military assault course has 10 obstacles, the obstacles are similar to the CISM design: a double beam;  a long crawl; a pit; stepping stones; a 3-bar vault; a zigzag balance beam; 2 sets of over under bars; 4 steps; and a 3 m high ramp with rope. Whilst ideally 250m long, the course can be between 150m and 300m long dependant on available space.

The standard French military Assault course is 500m long and has the following 20 obstacles: 5m high Rope Ladder; Double Beam 1 and 1.4m high; 6 Trip Wires 0.6m high 2m apart; 20m long Low Crawl under 0.5m; 5 Stepping Stones; 3 Bar Vault 2.3m high;  Balance Beam 1m high and 8.5m long; 5m high Vertical Ladder; Over and Under Beams 1.2m and 0.7m high; 2m high Irish Table; 0.8m high Low vault; 0.5m deep ditch; Ramp and Ditch; 1m Low wall; 0.7m deep ditch a 1.5 High Bund and a 0.7m Ditch; 2m High Wall; 2.2m deep Pit; 4m high Climbing Wall; 8m long Chicane; 3 Trenches the first narrow and 0.85 deep, the second 4m wide and 1.1m deep, the third narrow and 0.85 deep. Many of the obstacle are similar to those on the CISM (International Military Sports Council) obstacle course used for Military Pentathlon such as the Irish Table which is a plank 2m above the ground which requires both technique and strength to overcome. The 4m high climbing wall is particular to French assault courses and also requires good technique to climb.

The British Army has two standard designs. Type A, for trained soldiers and Type B, for training establishments. 

Type A, the design for trained soldiers has 18 different obstacles, and is usually wide enough to allow two teams to compete. The design includes: 4 steps up to 1.7m; monkey bars 5.4m long and 2.8m high; stepping-stones; 5.8m high cargo net; 10m long pipe crawl; rope swing over a 6.7m wide ditch; 4m high OBUA (Operations in Built Up Area) double wall with ladders up and between the walls with window openings; and 8m high climbing ropes. 

Type B, the design for British Army training establishments has 9 different obstacles. Most obstacles are built with 3 levels of difficulty: the vault has heights of 1.2m, 1.5m, and 2m; the high wall has heights of 2.1m, 2.5m and 3m; this allows the recruit to progress form easier to more challenging versions of the same obstacle as they progress through their training.  The design also includes ramps; ditches wet and dry; ropes and ladders to climb up 4.8m and then cross a rope or a rope bridge 7.3m long; and a 5m long maze. The maze is one of the newer obstacles and replaced a low knee high bar which could be either vaulted over or crawled under. 

Both British designs are adjusted to fit the available space and terrain features, obstacles are built between 5 and 10 yards apart, not all obstacles are always used, and obstacles from Type  A (Trained soldiers) may be used in a course at a Training Camp, for example the Assault Course used by British Army recruits at Pirbright has 10 obstacles, including a maze, 2 dry ditches and a cargo net, whilst the Assault Course at Worthy Down Camp has only 8 obstacles. The Royal Air Force uses the British Army designs, and has Assault Courses at RAF Honington, RAF Halton, and the Royal Air Force College at RAF Cranwell. HMS Collingwood, a Royal Navy, shore establishment has an Assault Course with suitable naval themed obstacles, it has water obstacles which are crossed with ropes and pulleys, as well as a wall to climb over and pipes, on a slope, to crawl up. HMS Raleigh (another RN shore establishment) also has an Assault Course.

The German Armed Forces’ Obstacle Course, 'Hindernisbahn-Bundeswehr', has 12 obstacles: a barricade of logs about .6m high; a log on 1.3m high metal post to roll over; 7 log steps to a height of 2.5m; 6 X shapes to climb over – like the US Army’s Tough Nut; 2 bar vault, the first bar .5m high, the second bar is .3m further and .8 m high; 2m high wooden wall; .5m vault, with a .5m deep ditch on the far side; balance log over a wide ditch; low wires to crawl under; trip wires to step over; a 1.8m deep and 1.8m wide trench to climb in and out of; a fox hole from which dummy grenades are then thrown at targets. 

The former country of the German Democratic Republic’s (East Germany) standard Sturmbahn (storm course) was 200m long and had the following obstacles: 1: 20m of 10 thigh high bars to step over or 6 concrete-semi circles to crawl under. 2: Ditch 2 m wide. 3: Climb a 3m rope to a 15-20m long horizontal rope and then climb down. 4: Climb a 2 m wall. 5: Climb onto the side of a pipe, jump onto a small platform, and then onto the side of another pipe. 6: A 10m tunnel accessed by a short vertical shafts. 7: Two trenches, divided by a fence. Jump over the first trench onto the foundation of the fence, climbed over the fence and jump over the second section of the trench. 8: Gable wall with upper and lower window with a rope. Then cross a plank, jump onto a 3 m high concrete platform, then a 1.5 m high concrete platform. 9: Seesaw 10: Climb into a foxhole, throw hand grenade, put on a gas mask and run back to the start of the Sturmbahn. 

India’s National Cadet Corps is a Tri Service Military Youth Organisation with cadet units at schools, colleges and universities. It has a standard Obstacle Course pattern consisting of 10 obstacles about 30 foot apart. The obstacles are suitable for cadets of a wide age range and are: 1: Straight Balance - a 12’ long 4’’ wide balance beam, 1.5’ above the ground. 2: Clear Jump – a 2’ bar to be cleared in one clear jump. 3: Zig-Zag balance – a 18’ long 3’’ wide 3 zig-zag beam starting at 1.5’ high and rising to 3.5’.  4: High wall – 6’ high brick wall 5: Double Ditch – 2 ditches about 6’ wide and about 4’ apart. 6:Right hand vault – a 3.5’ high bar which is vaulted supported by the right hand on the bar. 7: Left hand vault – a 3.5’ high bar which is vaulted supported by the left hand on the bar. 8: Gate vault – a 2 bar vault with the first bar at 3’ and the top bar at 5’. 9: Ramp - up to 4.5'.  10: Straight Balance again.

The Chinese People's Liberation Army has a standard Assault Course Test  which is 400m long and the soldier negotiates 16 obstacles. The Assault Course is 100m long with 8 obstacles. The Test starts with a 100m run along the side of the Assault Course and then turn about. Then 1: cross the stepping stones using only 3 in one row, 2: leap across a 2m wide, 2m deep vertical sided trench, 3: climb over a 1.1m high wall, 4: climb onto a 1.8m high platform, cross over on to two other lower platforms to, 5: move along the top of a horizontal ladder, 6: traverse the balance beam, 7: climb over the high wall, 8:crawl under six tripwires, then turn around, 9: step over six tripwires, 10: climb over the high wall,11: weave in and out of the 4 support post for the balance beam, 12: swing under the horizontal ladder, 13: cross two platforms to the 1.8m high platform and jump down, 14: climb through a 0.5m wide and 0.4m high hole in the low wall, 15: climb into the 2m wide 2m deep trench and out the other side, 16: cross all 5 stepping stones, then turn around and sprint the final 100m to the start/finish. The standard for under 24 year old's is 2 minutes and 35 seconds, with 2 minutes 20 seconds being good and 2 minutes 5 seconds being excellent. The 400m obstacle course is considered by Chinese soldiers to be harder than a 5km run, or a 5km speed march with 10kg. Artillery NCOs Zhang Heng and Li Xiaohoi have both achieved a time of 1 minute 23 seconds. 

Whilst the primary role of a military assault course is to improve fitness, they are also used for the assessment of personnel to see if they are suitable for a specific role. For example in the British Military potential paratroopers have to complete the British Army’s Parachute Regiment’s Trainasium, as one of the test, to be allowed to progress to Parachute Training, and the Royal Marine’s Bottom Field Assault Course has to be completed as one of the test for the award of the Commando Green Beret. Both of these assault courses have obstacles which provide a physical and psychological challenge to those completing them, the Trainasium has a lot of high obstacles and Bottom Field include a lot of obstacles with water. The German Army's Einzelkampferlehrgang (Individual Battle Course), a combat survival course, uses a timed assault course as one of its entry test. For the Basic Einzelkampferlehrgang Course it must be completed in 2 min 15 sec, and for the Advanced Course in 1 min 50 sec.

Trim trail
The term "trim trail" has also been applied to a series of wooden exercise stations, scattered in parkland or other locations beside a jogging or walking trail, which can be used to develop balance, strength and coordination. They are suitable for both adults and children, and the individual stations have been scientifically designed to provide a range of exercises. A key difference between a Trim Trail and an Assault Course is that on a Trim Trail at each exercise station the exercise is usually repeated multiple times as an exercise set, on an Assault Course the obstacle is only crossed once.

See also
Obstacle course
Fitness trail

References

Physical exercise
Military education and training